The Krankies Elektronik Komik is the Krankies' third solo attempt at a children's television show since Crackerjack, this  time on the BBC. featured in a total of three series. 'Elektronic Komik' returned for a fourth series, however this time was fronted by comedian Andrew O'Connor with no involvement from The Krankies.

References 

1985 British television series debuts
1987 British television series endings
BBC children's television shows
1980s British children's television series